Pambıqkənd is a village and municipality in the Salyan Rayon of Azerbaijan.  It has a population of 1,981.  The municipality consists of the villages of Pambıqkənd and Bəşirbəyli.

References 

Populated places in Salyan District (Azerbaijan)